Guillaume Michel Jérôme Meiffren Laugier (28 September 1772 – 27 September 1843) was a French ornithologist.

1772 births
1843 deaths
Barons of the First French Empire
French ornithologists
People from Arles